The national qualification frameworks in the United Kingdom are qualifications frameworks that define and link the levels and credit values of different qualifications.

The current frameworks are:
 The Regulated Qualifications Framework (RQF) for general and vocational qualifications regulated by Ofqual in England and the Council for the Curriculum, Examinations and Assessment (CCEA) in Northern Ireland;
 The Credit and Qualifications Framework for Wales (CQFW) in Wales, regulated by Qualifications Wales;
 The Scottish Credit and Qualifications Framework (SCQF)  in Scotland;
 The Frameworks for Higher Education Qualifications of UK Degree-Awarding Bodies (FHEQ) for qualifications awarded by bodies across the United Kingdom with degree-awarding powers.

Credit frameworks use the Credit Accumulation and Transfer Scheme, where 1 credit = 10 hours of nominal learning.

England, Wales and Northern Ireland 

The Regulated Qualifications Framework (England and Northern Ireland) is split into nine levels: entry level (further subdivided into sub-levels one to three) and levels one to eight; the CQFW (Wales) has the same nine levels as the RQF and has adopted the same level descriptors for regulated (non-degree) qualifications. The FHEQ in England, Wales and Northern Ireland has five levels, numbered four to eight to match the RQF/CQFW levels.

The descriptors for the RQF are as follows:

Normally (different rules apply for specifically-named qualifications such as GCSEs), the name of a qualification offered under the RQF will contain the name of the awarding organisation and the level of the qualification. It may also include "NVQ" to indicate that it meets certain criteria to be considered a vocational qualification: "the qualification is based on recognised occupational standards, confers occupational competence and requires work-based assessment and/or assessment in an environment that simulates the work place". The size of the qualification may be indicated by it being called an "Award" (less than 120 hours total qualification time/1–12 credits), "Certificate" (121 to 369 hours/13–36 credits) or "Diploma" (370 or more hours/37+ credits).

In general usage, qualifications are often compared to the best-known qualification at that level. For example, the Level 2 DiDA is often said to be equivalent to four GCSEs at grades A*–C.

While the frameworks say how qualifications compare in terms of size and level, they do not (except for the split of GCSEs across level 1 and 2) take grades into account, e.g. a first class honours degree and a pass degree are both 360 credit qualifications at level 6. For university entrance, the Universities and Colleges Admissions Service (UCAS) produces its own tariff for level 3 qualifications and international equivalents, based on grades achieved and the size of the qualification (in four size bands). Universities, colleges and employers are also free to make their own decisions on how they treat qualifications, and are not bound to follow the frameworks.

International equivalence

The RQF and CQFW have been referenced to the European Qualifications Framework (EQF) and can also be compared to the Common European Framework of Reference for Languages (CEFR), as laid out in the table below.

Scotland 

The Scottish Credit and Qualifications Framework (SCQF) is a 12-level framework that unites qualifications from the Scottish Qualifications Authority and higher education institutes with Scottish Vocational Qualifications and Modern Apprenticeships:

Higher education qualifications 
The Frameworks for Higher Education Qualifications of UK Degree-Awarding Bodies (FHEQ) includes separate descriptors for higher education (HE) qualifications in England, Wales and Northern Ireland and in Scotland for bachelor's degrees and below; for master's degrees and doctoral degrees the same descriptors apply across the UK. HE qualifications in Scotland are part of a sub-framework, the Framework for Qualifications of Higher Education Institutes in Scotland (FQHEIS), which is tied to the top six levels (7–12) of the SCQF. In England, Wales and Northern Ireland, the FHEQ uses the same numbering as the top 5 levels of the RQF and CQFW (4–8).

With respect to the European Higher Education Area (EHEA), only qualifications on the FHEQ (and only those with the full number of credits for that level) are certified as being equivalent to Bologna Process cycles, thus:

History

Development of the frameworks for higher education qualifications

The idea of a national framework for higher education qualifications (FHEQ) was proposed by the Dearing and Garrick Reports in 1997. Dearing's proposed FHEQ had 8 levels, not all of which were subsequently adopted:

Note "postgraduate conversion courses" were what are now called graduate certificates and diplomas but were, at the time of the report, often awarded as master's degrees, "Higher honours" referred to integrated master's degrees.

The first editions of the FHEQ were published by the Quality Assurance Agency  in January 2001 as two documents: one covering England, Wales and Northern Ireland, the other Scotland. As currently, the 2001 England, Wales and Northern Ireland FHEQ had five levels, the 2001 Scotland FHEQ had six levels. The Scottish FHEQ was tied to the SCQF, but the England, Wales and Northern Ireland FHEQ was not tied to the NQF until 2004, when the latter was reorganised (as described below). The levels were:

Note that while the framework for England, Wales and Northern Ireland did have numbered levels, the letter designations were often used to avoid confusion with the different numbering on the NQF.

The major difference between the 2001 framework and the current framework was the position of Ordinary (non-honours) bachelor's degrees. These were, at the time, considered to be at the same level as foundation degrees and diplomas of higher education in England, Wales and Northern Ireland, rather than being at the same level as honours degrees but with a lower credit value.

The Scottish FHEQ was certified as aligned with the framework of the European Higher Education Area (EHEQ) in 2007. The second edition of the FHEQ for England, Wales and Northern Ireland was issued in August 2008, and was also then certified as aligned with the EHEA framework. The major changes were the shifting of the non-honours bachelor's degree to its current position, allowing it to be considered a first cycle (end of cycle) qualification in the EHEA framework and the adoption of the NQF/QCF level numbers in place of the separate labelling of higher education levels; it also made explicit that primary qualifications in medicine, dentistry and veterinary science were at master's level. A second edition of the Scottish FHEQ was issued in June 2014, doing away with the separate labelling of levels in higher education and simply adopting the SCQF numbering, and a third edition of both, united into one document as The Frameworks for Higher Education Qualifications of UK Degree-Awarding Bodies, was published in November 2014. This gave unified level descriptors for master's degrees and doctoral degrees, while maintaining separate descriptors for lower level qualifications.

The Qualifications and Credit Framework

The Qualifications and Credit Framework was used from 2008 until 2015 in England, Wales and Northern Ireland. It replaced the National Qualifications Framework (NQF; see below) and was replaced in turn by the Regulated Qualifications Framework (RQF). It used the same levels as the (post 2004) NQF and the current RQF, but differed from the NQF in that in addition to qualifications being assigned a level they were assigned a credit value, indicating their size. The QCF had prescriptive rules on qualification design and assessment; a review in 2014 found that "the rules placed too much focus on structure, and not enough on validity, and that they were not flexible enough to meet the variety of needs covered by vocational qualifications". This led to the establishment of the RQF, which does not contain specific rules for qualifications in the manner of the QCF.

The National Qualifications Framework
National Qualifications Framework (NQF) was a former qualification framework developed for qualifications in England, Wales and Northern Ireland, which was in use until 2008.

The NQF was introduced to help employers compare the many hundreds of qualifications available in England, Wales and Northern Ireland. Originally, the framework only went up to Level 5, but in 2004 the old Level 4 was subdivided into Levels 4, 5 and 6 and the old Level 5 was subdivided into Level 7 and Level 8. This allowed the NQF to better align with its equivalent for higher education, the FHEQ.

The Framework, after 2004, had nine levels (with entry level qualifications offered at Entry 1, Entry 2 and Entry 3) covering all levels of learning in secondary education, further education, vocational, and higher education. Though academic higher education courses (such as academic degrees) were not covered in the NQF, it was broadly aligned with the Framework for Higher Education Qualifications (FHEQ), allowing levels of achievement to be compared.

Only when a course had been accredited and became part of the NQF was it then eligible for state funding. As such, some courses which were popular internationally and offered by British-based organisations were not available to state schools in England, Wales and Northern Ireland.

The NQF was the joint responsibility of England's QCA, Wales's DCELLS and Northern Ireland's CCEA.

BTECs and Cambridge courses are vocational equivalent, which under the QCF were equivalent to 1, 2 or 3 GCSEs or A Levels, at Grade A*-C.
OCR Nationals were discontinued in 2012.

The NQF was replaced with the QCF, Qualifications and Credit Framework in 2010, which was a credit transfer system which indicated the size of qualifications (measured in learning hours), as well as their level. The QCF was, in turn, replaced by the Regulated Qualifications Framework in October 2015.

Other frameworks

Frameworks for statistical purposes
The Higher Education Statistics Agency (HESA) classifies higher and further education courses using a more detailed framework using letter codes based on the original FHEQ. This separates postgraduate courses into research and taught, based on the largest component in terms of student effort. Doctorate-level courses are coded D for research and E for taught; master's-level courses are coded M for taught (including integrated master's courses) and L for research. Honours-level courses are coded H and non-honours bachelor's-level courses I (across the whole of the UK, not just Scotland, thus splitting level 6 on the England, Wales and Northern Ireland framework). Foundation degree/HND/DipHE-level qualifications are coded J and HNC/CertHE-level C.

At the FE stage, A-levels and similar level 3 qualifications (including the Scottish Advanced Higher, which is at level 7 on the SCQF, the same as HNCs and CertHEs) are coded P. Lower levels file alphabetically: Q for level 2, R for level 1 and S for entry level. X is used to code non-accredited/non-approved qualifications, Access to HE Diplomas and Welsh for Adults  qualifications.

The mapping to the ISCED 1997 international statistical classification levels has research courses at both doctoral and master's level (codes D and L) corresponding to ISCED level 6; taught courses at doctoral, master's and honours level (codes E, M and H) corresponding to level 5A; courses at non-honours bachelor's-level and foundation degree/diploma level (codes I and J) corresponding to level 5B; and courses at certificate level (code C) corresponding to level 5B or level 4. No  correspondence is given between the HESA framework and ISCED 1997 levels for FE qualifications.

The national mapping for ISCED gives equivalences for UK qualifications in both the 1997 and 2011 classifications:

UK ENIC Band Framework

The UK ENIC (European Network of Information Centres) uses a 16-level "band framework" in its evaluation of foreign qualifications to identify comparable British qualifications. UK ENIC issues statements of comparability and certificates based on these bands, which are designed to be precise enough to distinguish between different international awards and assist in informed decision making.

See also 
English as a second or foreign language
Common European Framework of Reference for Languages (CEFR)
Leitch Review of Skills
European Qualifications Framework

References 

Educational qualifications in the United Kingdom